Jalan Tampoi, Federal Route 3374 (formerly Johor State Route J2), is a dual carriageway industrial federal roads in Johor Bahru, Johor, Malaysia. Before Pasir Gudang Highway was built, Jalan Tampoi became the main road to Pasir Gudang together with Jalan Masai Lama (Johor State Route J10).

Route background
The Kilometre Zero is located at Tampoi town interchange. The stretch between Datin Halimah Interchange and Kampung Ubi are under construction by Malaysian Public Works Department (JKR) thru Syarikat Ismail Ibrahim Sdn Bhd as the Main Contractor. The existing two lanes will be fully four-lane roadways. Completion works expected on 25 May 2011.

At most sections, the Federal Route 3374 was built under the JKR R5 road standard, allowing maximum speed limit of up to 90 km/h.

List of interchanges and junctions

References

Expressways and highways in Johor